was a Japanese speed skater. He competed in two events at the 1952 Winter Olympics.

References

External links

1927 births
Possibly living people
Japanese male speed skaters
Olympic speed skaters of Japan
Speed skaters at the 1952 Winter Olympics
Sportspeople from Hokkaido
20th-century Japanese people